Tortricosia blanda is a species of moth in the subfamily Arctiinae first described by van Eecke in 1926. It is found on Sumatra, Peninsular Malaysia and Borneo.

References

Cisthenina